The Ministry of Culture and Creative Industries is a national ministry of the Government of Cape Verde, which is responsible for politics in the area of the country's culture.  Its current minister is Abraão Vicente who is since 2016.

Along with other posts, it was created in 1975 after Cape Verde became independent.

The post is responsible for famous historic landmarks.  It also has an institute (Portuguese: Instituto da Investigação e do Património Culturais (IIPC)), the Cultural Heritage Investigation Institute.

Ministers of Culture
Partial list from 2004
Manuel Veiga (2004 to 2011)
Mário Lúcio Sousa (2011-June 2016)
Vicente Abraão (since 2016)

References

External links
Website of the Ministry of Culture and Creative Industries 

 
Culture
Culture
1975 establishments in Cape Verde